Abel Millington (February 5, 17871838) was a Michigan politician and physician.

Early life
Millington was born on February 5, 1787, in Rutland, Vermont. In 1826, Millington moved to Ypsilanti Township, Michigan.

Career
Millington was a physician. In either 1825 or 1826, Harvey H. Snow transferred his ownership of Snow's Landing (now known as Rawsonville) to Millington. In 1826, Millington constricted a sawmill there. In 1827, Millington was unanimously elected the first supervisor of Ypsilanti Township, receiving 59 votes. The same year, Millington unsuccessfully ran for a seat in the Michigan Territorial Council, receiving 74 votes. In 1832, Millington was elect among the first trustees of the village of Ypsilanti. In 1833, Millington was elected as a member of the member of the Michigan Territorial Council from 4th district, receiving 537 votes. He served in this position from January 7, 1834, to August 25, 1835, alongside George Renwick. In 1835, Millington unsuccessfully ran for a seat in the Michigan Senate, receiving 771 votes. In 1836, Millington unsuccessfully ran for a seat in the Michigan House of Representatives, receiving 1,105 votes. Millington also served as sheriff of Washtenaw County, Michigan.

Removal from Michigan and death
In 1838, Millington moved to St. Charles, Illinois. He died there the same year.

References

1787 births
1838 deaths
Members of the Michigan Territorial Legislature
Michigan sheriffs
People from Rutland (town), Vermont
People from St. Charles, Illinois
People from Ypsilanti, Michigan
19th-century American politicians
19th-century American physicians